"I Hate Boys" is a song recorded by American recording artist Christina Aguilera for her sixth studio album, Bionic (2010). The song was written by Aguilera, Ester Dean, William Tyler, Bill Wellings, J. J. Hunter and Jamal Jones, who also handled the production of the track. "I Hate Boys" is a glam rock, pop and electropop song, containing elements of urban pop and synth-pop. Lyrically, it is a hate-driven song about ridiculing all boys.

"I Hate Boys" was released as the second and final single from Bionic in New Zealand and Australia. It was serviced to Australian radio on June 28, 2010, and released as a digital single in Australia and New Zealand on September 3. The song divided music critics; while some called it fun and a "girl anthem", others felt its lyrics were too juvenile and regarded it as filler. Upon the release of Bionic, "I Hate Boys" debuted at number 51 on the Gaon International Singles Chart during the week of June 6, 2010.

Background
Initially, "I Hate Boys" was supposed to be produced by Le Tigre. Group member Johanna Fateman wrote about working with Aguilera on their official website:
"… While the giant sound of her stacked vocals and the pop sheen she lends to the tracks might seem at odds with Le Tigre's aesthetic roots, it really works. The songs have a lot of elements we're known for, like a garage guitar sound, schoolyard chants, new wave-y synths, electro beats, and somehow it all sounds crazily right with Christina's unbelievable voice."

However, it was later revealed that the song was produced by Polow da Don and that Le Tigre only produced the song "My Girls". Polow da Don talked about working with Aguilera in a Billboard interview, stating: "There's two things you need to know about Christina Aguilera: The first is that, as far as her singing goes, she's a professionally trained animal. And the other is that she knows exactly, absolutely what she wants."

After "Not Myself Tonight", the song was released as the second single of the album in Australia and New Zealand. A digital single was released on the iTunes Store on September 3, 2010.

Composition

"I Hate Boys" was written by Aguilera, Jamal Jones, Ester Dean, William Tyler, Bill Wellings and J. J. Hunter, while production was handled by William Tyler & Polow da Don. Don has worked with Aguilera on the previous singles "Not Myself Tonight" and "Woohoo". "I Hate Boys" contains a sample from the 1973 track "Jungle Juice", by UK electronic act Elektrik Cokernut from their album Go Moog!. It is an uptempo glam rock, pop and electropop song with elements of synth-pop and urban pop, featuring gang chants in the background. Lyrically, "I Hate Boys" is a hate-driven song about ridiculing and insulting all bad boys. It begins with a drum beat similar to Katy Perry's "I Kissed a Girl" (2008), according to Idolator's Becky Bain, who also wrote that "it sounds almost directly inspired by the trash-talk obnoxiousness found in Avril Lavigne's "Girlfriend."

Critical reception

"I Hate Boys" received mixed reviews from music critics. In a positive review, Leslie Simon of MTV Buzzworthy wrote that the track is "a fun, highly synth-pop gum-smacking, girls-night-out rally anthem." Melinda Newman of HitFix called it a "pure pop infectious silliness." Mesfin Fekadu from The Boston Globe praised the song, writing, "The male-bashing 'I Hate Boys' has the right mix of energy and sass that Aguilera somewhat lacks throughout the album." The Scotsman wrote that the song is an "electro glam" that has "throwaway fun." Allison Stewart from The Washington Post referred to it as a "tame, hand-clappy pop song" and compared the track to Gwen Stefani's songs.

TJ of Neon Limelight gave a mixed review, calling it "sassy" but "would work better for an artist at least a decade younger than Aguilera", with its "painfully adolescent lyrics". Becky Bain of Idolator wrote, "It's one of those pandering songs that will no doubt have young girls singing along, particularly the chorus, but it's a lazy one that leaves rubs us the wrong way." Bradley Stern from MuuMuse named it a "filler, including the noisy, childish chant." Greg Kot of the Chicago Tribune commented that "it's the kind of trite glitter-disco might've dispensed", while comparing it to Spice Girls' songs. Eric Henderson gave to the song a negative review, writing, "Considering 'I Hate Boys' is closer than I ever thought Christina would ever come to recording a Daphne Aguilera track, it's ironically also one of many tracks on Bionic that sound tailor-made to accompany the opening credits of Johnny Weir's forthcoming reality show."

In his retrospective commentary on Bionic, Daniel Megarry of the Gay Times called "I Hate Boys" a tongue-in-cheek post-breakup anthem—a "cult favourite moment" on the album. Idolator's 2020 evaluation of the long play noted that the song "would have been a smash hit at any other time in Aguilera’s career".

Track listing 
Digital download
 "I Hate Boys" – 2:24
 "Not Myself Tonight" (Laidback Luke Radio Edit) – 3:39

Credits and personnel
Recording locations
Recording – No Excuses, Los Angeles, California
Vocal recording – The Red Lips Room, Beverly Hills, California

Personnel
Songwriting – Christina Aguilera, Jamal Jones, Ester Dean, William Tyler, Bill Wellings, J. J. Hunter
Production – Polow da Don
Mixing – Jaycen Joshua

Source:

Charts

Release history

References

2010 singles
Christina Aguilera songs
Songs written by Christina Aguilera
Songs written by Polow da Don
Songs written by Ester Dean
Songs with feminist themes
Song recordings produced by Polow da Don
RCA Records singles
Sony Music singles
2010 songs
Glam rock songs
American rock songs